Bloomingdale is a village in DuPage County, Illinois, United States, settled in 1833, and 25 miles northwest of downtown Chicago. The population was 22,382 at the 2020 census.

History

Bloomingdale is one of the earliest villages settled in what is now DuPage County. The Puzia family settled here in 1833, and by the end of the following year, 12 to 15 families had settled in the locality. It was originally named Meacham's Grove. The community was served by the Chicago-Galena Highway, modern day Lake Street. It became an important stop for stage coaches and westward travelers. Originally a Cook County settlement, it was annexed by DuPage County in 1839. The northern part of the village wanted to develop commercially while the southern part wished to remain a farming community. In 1923, the village split to accommodate this—the northern portion of the town was incorporated as Roselle. From 1950 to 1980, the population increased from 338 to 12,659.

The landmark U.S. Supreme Court case Illinois v. Gates began with an anonymous letter written to the Bloomingdale police department.

Points of interest
Stratford Square Mall, located at Springfield Road and Schick Road, is the largest of Bloomingdale's shopping centers. The indoor, landscaped mall contains two major department stores and 35 shops, plus 100 vacancies, as well as several restaurants with five vacant anchors (formerly six, yet one was demolished to make way for a Woodman's.)
Also, Old Town Bloomingdale, at the intersection of Lake Street and Bloomingdale Road, is a collection of small businesses, restaurants and shops located in restored buildings at the original site of the village's first settlement.

Geography
Bloomingdale is located at  (41.949540, -88.082564).

Demographics
As of the 2020 census there were 22,382 people, 8,695 households, and 5,503 families residing in the village. The racial makeup of the village was 68.19% White, 3.64% African American, 0.48% Native American, 15.24% Asian, 0.00% Pacific Islander, 4.17% from other races, and 8.28% from two or more races. Hispanic or Latino of any race were 12.29% of the population.

There were 8,695 households, out of which 48.21% had children under the age of 18 living with them, 52.37% were married couples living together, 7.27% had a female householder with no husband present, and 36.71% were non-families. 32.50% of all households were made up of individuals, and 15.01% had someone living alone who was 65 years of age or older. The average household size was 3.12 and the average family size was 2.42.

The village's age distribution consisted of 20.3% under the age of 18, 7.1% from 18 to 24, 26.2% from 25 to 44, 24.8% from 45 to 64, and 21.6% who were 65 years of age or older. The median age was 40.9 years. For every 100 females, there were 89.8 males. For every 100 females age 18 and over, there were 88.7 males.

The median income for a household in the village was $87,397, and the median income for a family was $107,250. Males had a median income of $62,115 versus $42,861 for females. The per capita income for the village was $47,926. About 3.3% of families and 6.9% of the population were below the poverty line, including 6.2% of those under age 18 and 5.8% of those age 65 or over.

Education
Elementary school districts serving Bloomingdale include:
 Bloomingdale School District 13
 Community Consolidated School District 93
 It is headquartered in Bloomingdale and operates two schools in Bloomingdale: Stratford Middle School and the Early Childhood Center.
 Keeneyville School District 20
 Marquardt School District 15
 It operates Winnebago Elementary School in Bloomingdale.
 Medinah District 11

High school districts include:
 Glenbard Township High School District 87
 Students in the section of Bloomingdale within District 87 are zoned to either Glenbard East High School in Lombard or Glenbard North High School in Carol Stream.
 Lake Park High School (District 108) in Roselle

Bloomingdale has one private school, St. Isidore School.

Nearby private schools:
 St. Francis High School in Wheaton
 St. Matthew School in Glendale Heights
 St. Walter Catholic School in Roselle
 Trinity Lutheran School in Roselle

The community is served by the  Bloomingdale Public Library.

Religious institutions 
Religious institutions found within the village of Bloomingdale include:

 Bloomingdale Church
 Bloomingdale Community Church
 Church of the Incarnation (Episcopal)
 Church of Jesus Christ of Latter Day Saints
 Cornerstone Faith Community Church
 Mission Church
 Shree Radhey Shyam Temple
 St. Andrew's Ukrainian Orthodox Church
 St. Isidore's Roman Catholic Church
 World Mission Society Church of God

Notable people 

 Nate Fox, professional basketball player
 Frank C. Rathje, president of the American Bankers Association, founder of the Mutual National Bank of Chicago

References

External links

 
 Bloomingdale Historical Society
 Bloomingdale Public Library official website
 Bloomingdale School District 13
 Images of historic Bloomingdale from the Bloomingdale Heritage Collection at Bloomingdale Public Library

 
1833 establishments in Illinois
Chicago metropolitan area
Populated places established in 1833
Villages in DuPage County, Illinois
Villages in Illinois